Nasrat Zaki Al Jamal (born 1 July 1980) is a Lebanese footballer who plays as an attacking midfielder for  club Okhwa Kharayeb.

Club career 
Al Jamal began his career at Lebanese Premier League side Tadamon Sour during the 1998–99 season, with whom he stayed until the 2003–04 season. He helped his side win their first Lebanese FA Cup in 2000–01.

In 2004 Al Jamal joined Ansar; he suffered an injury in November 2004, having to undergo surgery. Despite his injury, Al Jamal scored two goals in the league during the 2004–05 season. The following two seasons (2005–06 and 2006–07), Al Jamal helped Ansar win two domestic doubles (league and cup) in a row, as well as another cup in 2009–10.

On 27 May 2010, Al Jamal moved to Iraqi side Duhok on a three-month loan; he helped the Iraqi side win the 2009–10 Iraqi Premier League. He stayed at Duhok for another season (2010–11), before returning to Ansar in 2011. During his second spell at Ansar, Al Jamal won a league title (2011–12) and a Lebanese Super Cup (2012).

In 2014 Al Jamal moved to Chabab Ghazieh, before joining Lebanese Third Division side Abbasiyah on 14 January 2015. In 2016 he moved back to Tadamon Sour, where he retired in 2018. He came back from retirement in 2020, signing for 
Okhwa Kharayeb on 17 December in the Lebanese Third Division.

International career 
In 2002, Al Jamal played for the Lebanon Olympic team at the 2002 Asian Games, where he scored three goals.

Al Jamal had made his senior international debut for Lebanon in 1999, in a friendly against Malta; the match ended 0–0. Al Jamal was part of Lebanon's 2000 AFC Asian Cup squad, but didn't play. His first international goal came on 9 September 2003, in a friendly against Bahrain. Al Jamal ended his international career with 30 caps and three goals.

Career statistics

International 
 Scores and results list Lebanon's goal tally first, score column indicates score after each Al Jamal goal.

Honours 
Tadamon Sour
 Lebanese FA Cup: 2000–01

Ansar
 Lebanese Premier League: 2005–06, 2006–07
 Lebanese FA Cup: 2005–06, 2006–07, 2009–10, 2011–12
 Lebanese Super Cup: 2012

Duhok
 Iraqi Premier League: 2009–10

Individual
 Lebanese Premier League Best Young Player: 1998–99
 Lebanese Premier League Team of the Season: 2001–02, 2004–05

References

External links
 
 

1980 births
Living people
People from Tyre District
Lebanese footballers
Association football midfielders
Tadamon Sour SC players
Al Ansar FC players
Duhok SC players
Chabab Ghazieh SC players
Lebanese Premier League players
Iraqi Premier League players
Lebanese expatriate footballers
Lebanese expatriate sportspeople in Iraq
Expatriate footballers in Iraq
Lebanon youth international footballers
Lebanon international footballers
2000 AFC Asian Cup players
Asian Games competitors for Lebanon
Footballers at the 2002 Asian Games